Chris Okafor is a Nigerian Christian minister and televangelist. He is leader and founder of the Mountain of Liberation and Miracle Ministry, also known as Liberation City.

Okafor also runs skills programs and scholarships for underprivileged students via the Chris Okafor Humanity Foundation. His missionary organization, Chris Okafor's World Outreach Ministry (COWOM), preaches Liberation theology in many African countries, and operates a television channel called Liberation TV.

Publications
 Changing Family Altars and Patterns Volume 1 
 Changing Family Altars and Patterns Volume 2 
 Dealing with Enemies Behind The Scene 
 The Jinx Breaker

References

1970 births
Living people
Faith healers
People from Benin City
Nigerian Christian clergy
Protestant religious leaders
Television evangelists